Tega Industries Ltd. is an Indian  corporation, headquartered in Kolkata. A constituent of MM Group of Companies, it provides customized products and services for mining, mineral beneficiation, bulk material handling, and slurry transportation industries.

The company specializes in the manufacturing, distribution, and life cycle management of wear resistant lining components required for grinding, sizing and beneficiation of minerals, downstream equipment such as hydro-cyclones and flotation columns, fluid transportation and filtration systems used in the industry.

History 

Tega was started in 1976 by Madan Mohanka, an early alumnus of Indian Institute of Management Ahmedabad. The company was first promoted through a technical and financial collaboration with Skega AB (a Swedish firm) and later fully acquired by Mohanka family in 1998.

 
Its first manufacturing facility was built in 1978 at Kalyani (West Bengal, India) and later another plant was established at Joka, a suburb of Kolkata city (West Bengal, India). In 2014, Tega commissioned its state of the art manufacturing base at Dahej (Gujarat, India) under special economic zone. In 2006, Tega launched its manufacturing operations in South Africa, followed by Australia and Chile operations in 2011.

Currently, the company has manufacturing facilities in India, Australia, South Africa and Chile. The sales manager in Chile has sales support infrastructure in 16 countries, and a customer base extending to more than 72 countries across the globe.

Organization 
Tega is basically a constituent of MM Group of companies, which primarily has two divisions:
 Material Group - Represented by Tega Industries Ltd, Losugen, Acotec, Tega Industries South Africa
 Environment Group - Represented by MM Aqua (Provides cooling tower solutions) & Maple (EM technology based Organic Agriculture input manufacturing company)

Business Expansion 

To augment its global operations and cater to the scattered customers base across continents, Tega ramped up its business through joint ventures, and mergers & acquisitions across different geographies: 
 In 1991, Tega formed Hosch Equipment (India) Ltd, a joint venture with Hosch (GB) Ltd
 In July 2006, Tega acquired Beruc Equipments (Pty) Ltd, a South Africa based manufacturer and distributor of grinding mill liners.
 In January 2011 Tega made acquisition of Losugen Pty Ltd, an Australia based fabricator and distributor of  wear resistant liners.
 In February 2011 Tega acquired two more companies :
 Acotec S.A., a manufacturer of slurry transportation, pump and wear products
 Edoctum S.A, a market leader hosting mining trade Shows in Peru and Chile with ownership of Congresses such as Belt, Revemol, Minecrush, Corromin, Flotamin, Separación S/L, Fluimin, PumpTech, Prevemin, Etc.

In 2014, Tega bought stake in one more company :
 Tega Scanning Solutions, Canada, a new company focused on laser scanning of Mill Liner.

Product Portfolio 

Tega provides consulting services, product manufacturing, and on-site support to its customers for a wide range applications including the followings:
 Mill inner linings and reinforcement 
 Conveyor belt accessories and cleaners
 Wear resistant liners for chute management
 Screening panels
 Trommel structures
 Hydro cyclone systems for downstream application
 Pumps & liners for slurry transportation

Community Engagements 
Tega believes that companies do business in society. They recognize the fact that business exists because of community. Since its inception in 1976 and for that matter, 40 years back when companies did not provide social security for its workers, Tega was the first and only company to do so.

Tega has pioneered many innovative concepts for community services. "Bhavishya Aasha" is an initiative to fulfil the dreams of children whose parents are financially challenged. AHEAD was started as a "Rehabilitation and Research Institute for Autistic and Mentally Challenged Children". Similarly, Tega Industrial Technical School was started to impart skills to illiterate people. Besides it, Tega has been contributing in health, integrated village development, and enterprise development. These initiatives are not limited to India alone but to South Africa and other parts of the world.

References

Manufacturing companies based in Kolkata
1976 establishments in West Bengal
Indian companies established in 1976
Manufacturing companies established in 1976